Doral Senior High School may refer to:
 J. C. Bermudez Doral Senior High School
 Ronald W. Reagan/Doral Senior High School